Ooencyrtus is a genus of chalcid wasp. William Harris Ashmead named and circumscribed the genus in 1900.

Species
, approximately 320 species are recognized, including:
 Ooencyrtus anabrivorus 
 Ooencyrtus clisiocampae 
 Ooencyrtus johnsoni 
 Ooencyrtus kuvanae 
 Ooencyrtus marcelloi 
 Ooencyrtus papilionis

References

Further reading

 
 
 

Encyrtinae
Hymenoptera genera